Litoreibacter halocynthiae is a Gram-negative and non-motile  bacterium from the genus of Litoreibacter which has been isolated from the sea squirt Halocynthia roretzi from the South Sea in Korea.

References 

Rhodobacteraceae
Bacteria described in 2013